Garbageheads on Endless Stun is an album by East River Pipe, released in 2003.

Track listing
"Where Does All the Money Go?" – 3:06
"Monumental Freaks" – 2:59
"I Won't Dream About the Girl" – 4:30
"I Bought a Gun in Irvington" – 5:04
"Girls on the Freeway" – 2:41
"The Long Black Cloud" – 3:45
"Arrival Pad #19" – 3:47
"Streetwalkin' Jean" – 4:56
"Stare the Graveyard Down" – 5:04
"Millionaires of Doubt" – 4:36
"It's Always Been This Way" – 4:14

References

2003 albums
East River Pipe albums